Graham Williams (28 July 19441 July 1994) was an English professional rugby league footballer who played in the 1960s and 1970s and coached in the 1980s.

Rugby league career
Williams was born in July 1944 in Swinton near Manchester in Lancashire and attended the local boys' secondary school Cromwell Road Secondary Modern School for Boys between 1955 and 1959. Keen at sports in general, he eventually signed for his local rugby league club Swinton, known since Victorian times as "the Lions". He played for Swinton during their two successive Rugby Football League Championship winning seasons; 1962–63 season and 1963–64 season, where he often scored, or created tries with his blistering burst of pace when going at defenders. Many Lions fans believe he was the finest Swinton  of the post-war era when he wore the famous blue jersey for Swinton at their famous Station Road stadium, scene of many big matches - Test matches, Challenge Cup semi-finals, Lancashire County Cup finals and Championship finals during the period from the 1930s to the 1980s. Graham Williams then moved to Australia, joining North Sydney, and then Manly.

County Cup Final appearances
Graham Williams played  in Swinton's 4–12 defeat by St. Helens in the 1964 Lancashire County Cup Final during the 1964–65 season at Central Park, Wigan on Saturday 24 October 1964.

BBC2 Floodlit Trophy Final appearances
Graham Williams played  in Swinton's 2–7 defeat by Castleford in the 1966 BBC2 Floodlit Trophy Final during the 1966–67 season at Wheldon Road, Castleford on Tuesday 20 December 1966.

He also played in the golden-oldies matches in the early 1980s, as well as spending some time on the Gold Coast, Queensland coaching Burleigh.

Personal
Williams was born to Alfred and Olwen (née Jacks) whose marriage was registered during fourth ¼ 1938 in Barton district. Graham Williams married twice in his life. His first wife, Patricia, drowned after a parachuting accident, and they had one son Damian, he later remarried a British school teacher Sandra and adopted her two daughters Sophia, and the future designer, media personality, and entrepreneur; Harlette. Williams, in the 1980s was a regular on the boating scene on Sydney Harbour. He never forgot his roots as he often returned to his hometown of Swinton and Pendlebury, just outside Manchester, to visit old friends and relatives in the district.

Death
He was killed in Sydney in a motorbike accident, shortly before his 50th birthday.

References

External links
Statistics at afltables.com

1944 births
1994 deaths
Burleigh Bears coaches
English rugby league coaches
English rugby league players
Lancashire rugby league team players
Manly Warringah Sea Eagles players
Motorcycle road incident deaths
North Sydney Bears players
Road incident deaths in New South Wales
Rugby league halfbacks
Rugby league players from Swinton, Greater Manchester
Swinton Lions players